Two-time defending champion Monica Seles defeated Steffi Graf in the final, 4–6, 6–3, 6–2 to win the women's singles tennis title at the 1993 Australian Open. It was Seles' third Australian Open title in as many appearances at the event.

Seeds
The seeded players are listed below. Monica Seles is the champion; others show the round in which they were eliminated.

  Monica Seles (champion)
  Steffi Graf (finalist)
  Gabriela Sabatini (semifinals)
  Arantxa Sánchez Vicario (semifinals)
  Mary Joe Fernández (quarterfinals)
  Conchita Martínez (fourth round)
  Jennifer Capriati (quarterfinals)
  Jana Novotná (second round)
  Manuela Maleeva (fourth round)
  Mary Pierce (quarterfinals)
  Anke Huber (fourth round)
  Lori McNeil (second round)
  Nathalie Tauziat (fourth round)
  Katerina Maleeva (fourth round)
  Magdalena Maleeva (fourth round)
  Zina Garrison (third round)

Qualifying

Draw

Key
 Q = Qualifier
 WC = Wild card
 LL = Lucky loser
 r = Retired

Finals

Earlier rounds

Section 1

Section 2

Section 3

Section 4

Section 5

Section 6

Section 7

Section 8

External links
 1993 Australian Open – Women's draws and results at the International Tennis Federation
 Official results archive (WTA)

Women's singles
Australian Open (tennis) by year – Women's singles
1993 in Australian women's sport
1993 WTA Tour